Emperor Xian can refer to:

 Emperor Xian of Han (獻帝, 181–234), personal name Liu Xie
 Yongzheng Emperor (1678–1735), posthumous name Emperor Xian (憲皇帝)
 Xianfeng Emperor (1831–1861), posthumous name Emperor Xian (顯皇帝)

See also 
 Marquis Xian of Jin (Western Zhou)